This is a list of airlines which have an air operator's certificate issued by the Federal Aviation Administration of the United States.

Note:Destinations in bold indicate primary hubs, those in italic indicate secondary hubs, while those with regular font indicate focus cities.

See also
 List of airlines
 List of defunct airlines of Puerto Rico

Puerto Rico
Airlines
Puerto Rico
Puerto Rico
Airlines